Cushing Prince (October 28, 1745 – January 8, 1827) was a member of the Massachusetts House of Representatives from the District of Maine. His former home, at today's 189 Greely Road in Yarmouth, Maine, is now listed on the National Register of Historic Places. It was built in 1785.

Life and career
Prince was born on October 28, 1745, in North Yarmouth, Province of Massachusetts Bay (now in Maine), two years after the marriage of Paul Prince and Hannah Cushing. His father (for whom Yarmouth's Princes Point Road is named) compiled a bible, known as the Paul Prince Bible, containing the record of births of his children. It was printed in Edinburgh in 1791. Their other nine children were Sarah (born 1744), Rachel (1747), Hannah (1749), Ruth (1751), David (1753), Else (1756), Paul (1758), Pyam (1760) and Ammi (1763).

On August 30, 1773, he married Hannach Blanchard, daughter of Nathaniel and Bethiah, with whom he had three children: Cushing Jr., Polly and Olive.

In 1785, Prince had built a home at today's 189 Greely Road in Yarmouth. It is now on the National Register of Historic Places.

Prince was a member of the Massachusetts House of Representatives from the District of Maine, along with fellow North Yarmouth residents Ammi Ruhamah Mitchell and Edward Russell.

Death
Prince died on January 8, 1827, aged 81. He is interred in Yarmouth's Old Baptist Cemetery alongside his wife, who survived him by eighteen years.

References

People from North Yarmouth, Maine
1745 births
1827 deaths
Maine local politicians
18th-century American politicians
19th-century American politicians